Guðrún Kristjánsdóttir (born 25 November 1967) is an Icelandic alpine skier. She competed in the women's giant slalom at the 1988 Winter Olympics.

References

1967 births
Living people
Icelandic female alpine skiers
Olympic alpine skiers of Iceland
Alpine skiers at the 1988 Winter Olympics
Place of birth missing (living people)
20th-century Icelandic women